Ganapati Dadasaheb Yadav (born 14 September 1952) is an Indian chemical engineer, inventor and academic, known for his research on nanomaterials, gas absorption with chemical reaction and phase transfer catalysis. He served as the vice chancellor of the Institute of Chemical Technology, Mumbai (erstwhile UDCT) from 2009 until November 2019. He is currently the Emeritus Professor of Eminence at ICT Mumbai.

The Government of India awarded him the fourth highest civilian honour of the Padma Shri, in 2016, for his contributions to science and engineering. In 2022, he was elected member of the United States National Academy of Engineering.

Early life and education
Yadav was born on 14 September 1952 at Arjunwada village in Radhanagari tehsil in Kolhapur district, Maharashtra to Dadasaheb Krishnaji and Rukmini. He completed his early education at the local school in his village till class VII and later at Kolhapur till class XI. Joining the University Department of Chemical Technology (UDCT) of Bombay University in 1970, he graduated in chemical engineering in 1974 and started his career at the institution as a faculty member. Simultaneously, he continued his doctoral studies under the supervision of renowned chemical engineer, Man Mohan Sharma, to secure his PhD in 1980.

He served at Loughborough University of Technology, UK as a Leverhulme fellow (1980–81) and the University of Waterloo, Ontario as a Natural Sciences and Engineering Research Council fellow (1982–86).

Research 
Yadav is known to have done pioneering research on catalysis, with special focus on nanomaterials, green chemistry, nanocatalysis, energy engineering and biotechnology. He worked on substances like sulfated zirconia, heteropoly acids, clays and ion-exchange resins to develop reportedly improved techniques in oil recovery, phase transfer and heterogenous catalysis and invented new 2-D and 3-D models for flow visualization. He holds several Indian and US patents, reported to be 75 of them, for his inventions and innovations. His researches have been documented by way of 3 books, 15 book chapters and over 350 peer reviewed research papers. His articles are reported to have an H-index of 64 and i10-Index of 314 and one of his articles on sulfated zirconia has 746 citations. He has mentored 107 doctoral (PhD) and 135 masters students and delivered over 850 orations and keynote addresses.

Academic appointments
Yadav serves as the R. T. Mody Distinguished Professor at ICT. He holds a number of patents and is an elected fellow of such science academies as Institution of Chemical Engineers, The World Academy of Sciences, Indian National Science Academy and the National Academy of Sciences, India. He is J.C. Bose National Fellow and Adjunct Professor at RMIT University, Melbourne, Australia and University of Saskatchewan, Canada. He is a visiting professor at Lunghwa University of Science and Technology, and has served as Distinguished Asian Visiting Scholar at Purdue University (2007), Johansen Crosby Visiting Professor of Chemical Engineering at Michigan State University, (2001–02), Park Reilly Lecturer at University of Waterloo, (2011), and John van Geuns Lecturer at Van’t Hoff Institute for Molecular Sciences, University of Amsterdam (2012).

Yadav served as the president of the Indian Institute of Chemical Engineers (IIChE) in 2001 and it was during his term as the president, IIChE instituted 51 awards and endowments. As the director and vice chancellor of the Institute of Chemical Technology, he is reported to have created many faculty endowments and developed the infrastructure; G. D. Yadav Laboratory is one such centre of excellence in chemical research. He headed the Centre for Nanosciences and Nanotechnology and Centre for Green Technology of Mumbai University as the chief coordinator.

He is the president of the Catalysis Society of India and the Maharashtra Academy of Sciences. He was associated with the Indo-Canadian multi-disciplinary partnership, IC-IMPACTS, a partnership between 7 Indian institutes and 3 Canadian universities (University of British Columbia, University of Alberta and University of Toronto), where served as the coordinator for the Institute of Chemical Technology in 2013. When the India International Chemical Sciences Chapter of the American Chemical Society was officially established in 2015, he served as the founder chair of the organization and chaired APCAT-7, the 7th Asia Pacific Congress on Catalysis Societies in Mumbai in January 2017. 

He is associated with a number of scientific journals as a member of their editorial boards; Green Chemistry and Engineering, Begell Publishers, New York, Catalysis Today, Special Issue ‘Catalysis for Sustainable Development, Peace and Prosperity; APCAT-7 papers, European Journal of Biotechnology and Bioscience, Current Catalysis, Applied Catalysis A, Journal of Molecular Catalysis A, Catalysis Communications, International Journal of Chemical Reactor Engineering, Clean Technologies and Environmental Policy, ACS Sustainable Chemistry and Engineering, RSC Green Chemistry and Current Catalysis are some of them.

Awards and honors

Yadav received the Best Engineering College Teacher Award of the International Society for Technology in Education (ISTE) in 1994 and VASVIK Industrial Research Award in 1995. He received the IIEE Award for development of eco-friendly technologies in 1997, K. G. Naik Gold Medal of the Maharaja Sayajirao University of Baroda in 2002, and Anna University National Award for the most outstanding academic in 2005 before receiving the Distinguished Alumnus Award of the UDCT (2006). He received three awards in 2007, Prof. S. K. Bhattacharya Eminent Scientist Award of Catalysis Society of India, Chemtech Foundation Award and the Best Teacher Award of the Government of Maharashtra, followed by two more awards in 2009, Eminent Engineer Award of Institution of Engineers (India) and Hercules Padma Vibhuhan Professor C. N. R. Rao Medal and Chemcon Distinguished Speaker Award. In 2011, he received C. V. Raman Award and Green Chemistry Award of the Industrial Green Chemistry World followed by Goyal Prize of Kurukshetra University, Best Professor Award for Producing Maximum Peer Reviewed Paper, and the Best Researcher Award of PNG College of Engineering in 2012. The Indian Chemical Council awarded him the D. M. Trivedi Life Time Achievement Award in 2013 and he received the 15th NES Jagadguru Sankaracharya National Eminent Scientist Award in 2015. Besides, he has received seven awards from the Indian Institute of Chemical Engineers viz. Hindustan Lever Biennial Award for the Most Outstanding Chemical Engineer of the Year (1994), Herdillia Award for Excellence in Basic Research in Chemical Engineering (1999), DOST Professor S.K. Sharma Medal and Chemcon Distinguished Award (2005), K. Anji Reddy Innovator of the Year Award (2006), RPG Life Sciences Padma Vibhushan Professor M. M. Sharma Medal and Chemcon Distinguished Speaker Award (2010), Dr. B. P. Godrej Life Time Achievement Award (2013) and Asian Paints Padma Vibhushan Dr. R. A. Mashelkar Medal and CDS Award (2015).

Yadav has delivered several award orations; Cross Canada Lecture Tour of the Canadian Catalysis Society and Canadian Catalysis Foundation (2012–13), Dhirubhai Ambani Oration of IIChE-Reliance Industries (2014) and Dr. H. L. Roy Memorial Lecture (2008) of Indian Institute of Chemical Engineers are some of the notable ones. The National Academy of Sciences, India and the Maharashtra Academy of Sciences elected him as their fellow in 2003 and the Indian National Science Academy and Institution of Chemical Engineers followed suit in 2007. He is also an elected fellow (2010) of The World Academy of Sciences. Industrial & Engineering Chemistry Research, the official journal of the American Chemical Society, published a Festschrift editorial on him in its December 2014 issue. The Government of India awarded him the civilian honor of the Padma Shri in 2016.

Personal life
Yadav is married to Vasanti Veeraraghavan Iyer and the couple has two sons, Vikramaditya and Gautam. The family lives in Mumbai.

See also 
 Institute of Chemical Technology
 Man Mohan Sharma

Further reading

References

External links

Recipients of the Padma Shri in science & engineering
1952 births
Living people
People from Kolhapur district
University of Mumbai alumni
Institute of Chemical Technology alumni
Academic staff of the University of Mumbai
Academics of Loughborough University
University of Waterloo alumni
Academic staff of the University of Waterloo
Heads of universities and colleges in India
Lunghwa University of Science and Technology
Academic staff of the University of Amsterdam
Indian chemical engineers
20th-century Indian inventors
Engineers from Maharashtra
Indian scientific authors
Fellows of the Indian National Science Academy
TWAS fellows
20th-century Indian chemists
20th-century Indian engineers
Indian patent holders
Foreign associates of the National Academy of Engineering
Members of the United States National Academy of Engineering